Ben Popham  (born 4 September 2000) is an Australian Paralympic swimmer. He represented Australia at the 2019 World Para Swimming Championships, winning a silver and two bronze medals, and the 2020 Summer Paralympics in Tokyo, where he won two gold medals and a silver.

Personal
Popham was born on 4 September 2000. He was diagnosed with cerebral palsy as an infant. In 2011 he was chosen to be one of the Channel Seven Perth Telethon's "Little Telethon Stars". In 2019, he commenced a Bachelor of Commerce at Curtin University.

Swimming career
Popham commenced swimming as a seven year old as part of his physical therapy program for cerebral palsy. Popham made his international debut when he represented Australia at the 2018 Pan Pacific Para Swimming Championships in Cairns and won the Men's 100m Freestyle S8 and was a member of the Men's 4x100m Freestyle Relay (34 points) team.

At the 2019 World Para Swimming Championships in London, Popham won a silver medal in the Men's 100m Freestyle S8 and bronze medals in the Men's 50m Freestyle S8  and Men's 4 x 100m Freestyle 34 points.

At the 2020 Tokyo Paralympics, Popham won a gold medal in the Men's 100m freestyle S8 with a time of 57.37 Together with Rowan Crothers, Matt Levy and William Martin, he won gold and broke the current World Record for the Men's 4×100 m freestyle 34 pts by almost 2 seconds. In the Men's 4x100m Medley 34 pts, he swam together with Timothy Disken, Timothy Hodge, and William Martin. His team won the silver medal in a time of 4:07.70, just over a second behind the winners, RPC, who set a new world record. He also competed in the 400 m freestyle S8 where he qualified for the final. He came eighth in the final with a time of 4:49.32.

He has since been reclassified to an S9 swimmer, a class for athletes with more physical ability compared to the S8 classification.

Recognition
2018 – 'AIS Discovery of the Year' at Swimming Australia Awards.
2019 – Curtin University Sportsman of the Year 
2019 – Western Australian Swimming Multi-Class Swimmer of the Year
2021 –Western Australian Swimming Awards - Sir Frank Beaurepaire Memorial Trophy, Elizabeth Edmondson Medallist and Hancock Prospecting Patron's Trophy for Male Swimming
2021 - Swimming Australia Awards Swimmers' Swimmer with Grant Patterson
2022 – Medal of the Order of Australia for service to sport as a gold medallist at the Tokyo Paralympic Games 2020

References

External links
 
 
 

2000 births
Living people
Cerebral Palsy category Paralympic competitors
Swimmers at the 2020 Summer Paralympics
Medalists at the 2020 Summer Paralympics
Paralympic gold medalists for Australia
Paralympic silver medalists for Australia
Paralympic medalists in swimming
Swimmers with cerebral palsy
Male Paralympic swimmers of Australia
S8-classified Paralympic swimmers
Medalists at the World Para Swimming Championships
Recipients of the Medal of the Order of Australia
Australian male freestyle swimmers